Moisés Silva (born September 4, 1945) is a Cuban-born American biblical scholar and translator.

He was born in Havana, Cuba, and has lived in the US since 1960. He has taught biblical studies at Westmont College (1972–1981), Westminster Theological Seminary (1981–1996), and Gordon-Conwell Theological Seminary (1996–2000), where he was the Mary French Rockefeller Distinguished Professor of New Testament until his retirement. A past president of the Evangelical Theological Society (1997), Silva for many years had been an ordained minister of the Orthodox Presbyterian Church. He served as a translator of the New American Standard Bible, the New Living Translation (Ephesians–Philemon), the English Standard Version and the Nueva Versión Internacional, and as a New Testament consultant for Eugene Peterson's The Message. He has also authored or coauthored several books and articles, including a highly acclaimed commentary on Philippians; Invitation to the Septuagint (with Karen Jobes); God, Language, and Scripture; Has the Church Misread the Bible?; and An Introduction to Biblical Hermeneutics (with Walter Kaiser, Jr.). He is editor of the second edition of the New International Dictionary of New Testament Theology and Exegesis (NIDNTTE), formerly edited by Colin Brown.  He currently resides in Litchfield, Michigan, where he continues his work as an author and editor.

Silva holds degrees from Bob Jones University (BA, 1966), Westminster Theological Seminary (BD, 1969; ThM, 1971), and the University of Manchester (PhD, 1972).  At Manchester he studied under New Testament and Biblical Studies luminaries, F. F. Bruce and James Barr. The latter's The Semantics of Biblical Language (1961) was a strong influence on Silva's Biblical Words and Their Meaning (1983, 2nd ed. 1994), which challenged many common linguistic fallacies in biblical interpretation.

Works

References

American biblical scholars
Translators of the Bible into English
Westminster Theological Seminary faculty
1945 births
Living people
Orthodox Presbyterian Church ministers
Bob Jones University alumni
Westminster Theological Seminary alumni
Alumni of the University of Manchester
Gordon–Conwell Theological Seminary faculty
Westmont College faculty
People from Havana
Cuban emigrants to the United States
Calvinist and Reformed biblical scholars
North American biblical scholars